Arisi is a surname. Notable people with the surname include:

Alessia Arisi (born 1971), Italian table tennis player
Sollecito Arisi (16th–17th centuries), Italian Augustinian monk and painter